Esztergomi Vitézek RAFC (also known as Esztergomi Vitézek Suzuki for sponsorship reasons) is a Hungarian rugby club in Esztergom. They currently play in the Extraliga and are one of the most successful teams in the country, having won nine out of the last ten Championships. Their second team play in Nemzeti Bajnokság I.

History
The club was founded in 1983.

Honours
 Nemzeti Bajnokság I
 1999, 2000, 2001, 2002, 2003, 2004, 2005, 2006, 2007, 2008, 2012
 Nemzeti Bajnokság II
 1994
 Hungarian Cup
 2000, 2001, 2008, 2009, 2010, 2011, 2012

Current squad

References

External links
  Esztergomi Vitézek Rugby SE

Hungarian rugby union teams
Rugby clubs established in 1983
Esztergom